Belarus participated in the Eurovision Song Contest 2006 with the song "Mum" written by Andrey Kostyugov and Sergey Sukhomlin. The song was performed by Polina Smolova. The Belarusian entry for the 2006 contest in Athens, Greece was selected through a national final organised by the Belarusian broadcaster National State Television and Radio Company of the Republic of Belarus (BTRC). The national final consisted of a semi-final which was a televised production and an untelevised final held on 10 February 2006 and 27 February 2006, respectively. Fifteen competing acts participated in the semi-final where the top three entries as determined by a public televote qualified to the final. In the final, an eight-member jury panel selected "Mama" performed by Polina Smolova as the winner. The song was later retitled for the Eurovision Song Contest as "Mum".

Belarus was competed in the semi-final of the Eurovision Song Contest which took place on 18 May 2006. Performing during the show in position 5, "Mum" was not announced among the top 10 entries of the semi-final and therefore did not qualify to compete in the final. It was later revealed that Belarus placed twenty-second out of the 23 participating countries in the semi-final with 10 points.

Background 

Prior to the 2006 contest, Belarus had participated in the Eurovision Song Contest two times since its first entry in 2004. The nation's best placing in the contest was thirteenth in the semi-final, which it achieved in 2005 with the song "Love Me Tonight" performed by Angelica Agurbash.

The Belarusian national broadcaster, National State Television and Radio Company of the Republic of Belarus (BTRC), broadcasts the event within Belarus and organises the selection process for the nation's entry. Since 2004, BTRC has organised a national final in order to choose Belarus' entry, a selection procedure that continued for their 2006 entry.

Before Eurovision

Eurofest 2006 
The Belarusian national final consisted of a semi-final and final held on 10 February 2006 and 27 February 2006, respectively. The televised portion of the competition was broadcast on the First Channel and Belarus TV as well as online via the broadcaster's official website tvr.by.

Competing entries 
Artists and composers were able to submit their applications and entries to the broadcaster between 29 November 2005 and 12 January 2006. At the closing of the deadline, 73 entries were received by the broadcaster. A jury panel was tasked with selecting up to fifteen entries to proceed to the televised national final. The jury consisted of Mihail Finberg (chairman of the jury, director of the Belarusian State Academic Symphony Orchestra), Valeriy Grebenko (head of sound engineering of BTRC), Oleg Eliseenkov (composer), Eduard Zaritsky (composer), Leonid Zakhlevny (director of the ensemble Byasyeda), Valeriy Pestov (director of programme production of BTRC), Vasily Rainchik (musician/composer) and Vladimir Ugolnik (lecturer at the Belarusian State University of Culture and Arts). Fifteen semi-finalists were selected and announced on 18 January 2006. Prior to the semi-final, Polina Smolova opted to withdraw her original song "Sait odinochestva" and was replaced with the song "Mama".

Semi-final 
The televised semi-final took place on 10 February 2006 at the Republic Palace in Minsk, hosted by Denis Kurian. Prior to the semi-final, a draw for the running order took place on 24 January 2006. Public televoting exclusively selected the top three songs to qualify to the final.

Final 
The untelevised final took place on 27 February 2006. The votes of jury members made up of music professionals selected the song "Mama" performed by Polina Smolova as the winner.

At Eurovision
According to Eurovision rules, all nations with the exceptions of the host country, the "Big Four" (France, Germany, Spain and the United Kingdom) and the ten highest placed finishers in the 2005 contest are required to qualify from the semi-final in order to compete for the final; the top ten countries from the semi-final progress to the final. On 21 March 2006, a special allocation draw was held which determined the running order for the semi-final on 18 May 2006. Belarus was drawn to perform in position 5, following the entry from Andorra and before the entry from Albania. At the end of the semi-final, Belarus was not announced among the top 10 entries in the semi-final and therefore failed to qualify to compete in the final. It was later revealed that the Belarus placed twenty-second in the semi-final, receiving a total of 10 points.

The semi-final and the final were broadcast in Belarus on the First Channel with commentary by Denis Dudinskiy. The Belarusian spokesperson, who announced the Belarusian votes during the final, was Corrianna.

Voting 
Below is a breakdown of points awarded to Belarus and awarded by Belarus in the semi-final and grand final of the contest. The nation awarded its 12 points to Russia in the semi-final and the final of the contest.

Points awarded to Belarus

Points awarded by Belarus

References

2006
Countries in the Eurovision Song Contest 2006
Eurovision